Eduardo Nascimento Costa (born 23 September 1982), known as Eduardo Costa, is a Brazilian professional football coach and former player who played as a defensive midfielder. He is the current head coach of Atlético Catarinense.

Career 
Eduardo was born in Florianópolis, Brazil. In 2007 he played for Grêmio on loan from RCD Espanyol. He was especially noted for being an extremely tight marker, and is booked with alarming regularity 

A member of Brazil's Under 17 World Cup winning side, he came to France in 2001 to play for FC Girondins de Bordeaux, where he commanded a regular first team spot for three seasons, including playing a key role in Bordeaux's UEFA Cup run during the 2002–03 season. He followed that with a move to Olympique de Marseille, but after an unhappy year there, he was signed by Espanyol in 2005 for €4 million in four-year contract. He did not play in 2008–09 Ligue 1, as he would occupied a non-EU quota. In January 2009 he left for São Paulo in three-year contract.

On 8 August 2009, he signed with AS Monaco FC on a three-year deal.

In December 2010, Eduardo Costa was loaned to Vasco da Gama for six months. Six months after it became a permanent deal following Monaco's relegation from the Ligue 1.

Honours

Club
Grêmio
Copa do Brasil (Brazilian Cup): 2001 
Campeonato Gaúcho: 2001

Bordeaux
Coupe de la Ligue (French League Cup): 2002

Espanyol
Copa del Rey (Spanish League Cup): 2006

Vasco da Gama
Copa do Brasil (Brazilian Cup): 2011

International
Brazil
FIFA U-17 World Cup: 1997

References

External links
 
 

1982 births
Sportspeople from Rio Grande do Sul
Living people
Brazilian footballers
Brazil under-20 international footballers
Brazil international footballers
2003 FIFA Confederations Cup players
Campeonato Brasileiro Série A players
Campeonato Brasileiro Série B players
La Liga players
Ligue 1 players
Grêmio Foot-Ball Porto Alegrense players
São Paulo FC players
CR Vasco da Gama players
Avaí FC players
FC Girondins de Bordeaux players
Olympique de Marseille players
AS Monaco FC players
RCD Espanyol footballers
Brazilian expatriate footballers
Expatriate footballers in France
Expatriate footballers in Monaco
Expatriate footballers in Spain
Association football midfielders
Brazilian football managers
Clube Atlético Metropolitano managers
Clube Esportivo Lajeadense managers